Chen Wen-bin (born 5 October 1973 in Taiwan) was a professional baseball player in Japan's Nippon Professional Baseball and Taiwan's Chinese Professional Baseball League.

External links

Living people
1973 births
Fukuoka Daiei Hawks players
Uni-President Lions players
Sinon Bulls players
Koos Group Whales players
Chinatrust Whales players
Taiwanese expatriate baseball players in Japan
People from Pingtung County
Fu Jen Catholic University alumni